Julius Hulburt (November 4, 1805 – October 15, 1881), was a member of the Wisconsin State Assembly.

He in was born in New York. He married Sarah M. Vosburg. Both of them Baptists, they had four children and settled in what is now Green County, Wisconsin. Hulburt died on October 15, 1881.

One of Julius and Sarah's children, Chauncey, owned what is now known as the C.D. Hulburt House, listed on the National Register of Historic Places.

Career
Hulburt was a member of the Assembly from 1850 to 1851. He was a member of the Whig Party.

References

External links
 

Baptists from Wisconsin
19th-century American politicians
Baptists from New York (state)
People from Green County, Wisconsin
Members of the Wisconsin State Assembly
Wisconsin Whigs
1805 births
1881 deaths
Burials in Wisconsin
19th-century Baptists